Zinc transporter 4 is a protein that in humans is encoded by the SLC30A4 gene.

See also
 Solute carrier family

References

Further reading

Solute carrier family